The South Korea women's national futsal team is controlled by the Korea Football Association, the governing body for futsal in South Korea and represents the country in international futsal competitions.

Tournament record

Asian Indoor and Martial Arts Games
 Thailand 2005 – Did not enter
 Macau 2007 – Did not enter
 Vietnam 2009 – Did not enter
 Qatar 2011 – Cancelled
 South Korea 2013 – Did not enter (although hosted)
 Turkmenistan 2017 – Did not enter

See also
 South Korea national teams
Women's
 Footballers
 Football team (Results)
 Under-20 football team
 Under-17 football team
 Futsal team
Men's
 Footballers
 Football team (Results)
 Football B team (Unofficial match results)
 Under-23 football team (Results)
 Under-20 football team
 Under-17 football team
 Futsal team
 Beach soccer team

References

External links
 Korea Football Association 

Korea Republic
National team
Women's football in South Korea
Futsal